Men of Letters may refer to:
Man of letters, certain types of intellectual people
Men of Letters, a 2014 history book about the Post Office Rifles by Duncan Barrett
Men of Letters, a group of characters in the TV series Supernatural
English Men of Letters, a series of literary biographies published by Macmillan